Geeta Poduval (born November 10) is a social entrepreneur, motivational speaker, counsellor and activist for disabled people. She is the Founder-Director of DRZYA, a firm that brings disabled and unique performances, talks and workshops from across the world on one platform. Through DRZYA, she scouts for talent among specially abled, trains them and provides them a platform to perform and earn a livelihood. She is also the Founder-Trustee of Drzyashakti Trust, an NGO for the services of disabled people. In the past, she has been a film and TV actress, anchor and CAG Senior Audit Officer (Comptroller and Auditor General - India's national and state audit authority). The two notable films to her credit are Sukumarji's Kandethal (Malayalam) and Madhu Kaithapram's Vellivelichathil (Malayalam).

Early life and background
Geeta was born in Ahmedabad in a middle class Malayali family. She joined CAG and passed the internal officer's grade examination. During this time she handled many audits including the UN Audit in Western Africa. She worked for the organisation for twenty years until her voluntary retirement in 2014 as Senior Audit Officer. 
Parallel to her career, she pursued her singing, classical dancing and acting interests. While in the service, she participated in one of the  talent shows on Amrita TV, and then took up various anchoring and acting projects. Geeta also wrote short stories and articles for  magazines including Femina and Woman's Era and conducted motivational talk sessions and training programs for government organisations, PSUs and Corporate houses. She has also been involved in social activism. In 2017 she founded Drzya, a firm that offers disabled artists opportunity to showcase their talent professionally and participate in inspirational talks and workshops. Later in 2018 she founded Drzyashakti Trust to serve and promote the causes of disabled people. Presently she is involved in capacity building of disabled people, counselling and mentoring them, delivering workshops and inspirational talks.

Anchoring
Geeta has anchored over 500 shows in India and abroad, ranging from award functions, cultural meets, musical nights, corporate events and social meets in Hindi, English, Gujarati and Malayalam languages. 
 Hosted 1st Gateway Litfest at NCPA, Mumbai in 2016.
 Hosted virtual conference 'Leadership During Crisis: Learning from the Forces' in August 2020 to pay tribute to the police and paramilitary forces 
 Anchor for Malayalam Film Reviews and Box Office Reports for Idea Popcorn Street since 2015
 Co-host of a television series titled “Amchi Mumbai” on Kairali TV
 Host of a music concert starring Mithoon, the famous music director and singer, Arijit Singh, Roop Kumar Rathod, Palak, Mohammad Irfan, in June 2014 in Muscat
 Hosted the three-day India Fest in Abu Dhabi in December 2014
 Hosted three years in a row, the Chhatrapati Shivaji Maharaj Achievement Awards in Mumbai (2013, 2014 and 2015)
 Hosted “Musical Rain” show of K. J Yesudas, K. S Chithra, Meera Nandan, Vijay Yesudas and Shweta Mohan in May 2015 in Bahrain
 Hosted "Yeh Shaam Mastaani...", a musical show on the 86th Birthday celebration of Kishore Kumar with singers Amit Kumar, Shri Babul Supriyo, Shailaja Subramanian, Kavita Paudwal and Siddhant Bhosle in August 2015, Shanmukhnanda Hall, Mumbai
 Hosted Kashmir to Kerala Social Foundation Gala Awards Night 2016, 2017 & 2018 in Mumbai attended by Indian dignitaries including Farooq Abdullah, Vivek Oberoi, Maharaja of Udaipur, Sandeep Thakur

Acting
Geeta has acted in films, TV serials, corporate films and advertisements.
 Vellivelichatthil – In the Limelight (Malayalam, released 2014). She played the second heroine in the film as John Brittas’ wife. Directed by Madhu Kaithapram and music by Deepankuran Bijibal the film was completely shot in Muscat.
 Kandethal – The Revelation (Malayalam, released 2016). She played the female protagonist. Directed by Sukumarji.
 Crime Branch (Malayalam, TV serial, 2014). Played the lead role of Assistant Commissioner of Police for eight episodes for Kairali TV Channel.
 A corporate film for Rohm and Hazz (erstwhile Dow Chemicals)
 Appeared in an ad of Nerolac Paints with Shah Rukh Khan (2014)

Training and speaking
Geeta has been a speaker at various forums and events. She was a speaker at TEDxYouth@JGIS. She was invited as the Keynote speaker during the Daughters’ Day celebration of the Bengaluru chapters of PRCI and YCC.
She has been conducting training programs and motivational talks for corporate houses and government organisations for many years on a wide range of topics including women leadership, diversity and inclusion, POSH, managing life and life goals among others.

Awards and honors
 Juries Special Award - Communication through Social Media 2017 by the Public Relations Council of India (PRCI) for outstanding contribution to the Profession, Industry and Society
 Indywood Media Excellence Award 2017 in the Professional Excellence category in her capacity as an online media social activist, motivational speaker, corporate trainer and films and television
 Honoured by The Western India Football Association (WIFA) for her contribution in training the Coaches
 Prateeksha Foundation NGO Award 2018 for Social Service
 Inspire India Award by Prerna Foundation, Bhopal for Social Service

References

Living people
Year of birth missing (living people)